The 2020 World Grand Prix (also known as the Matchroom World Grand Prix 2020) was a professional snooker tournament, that took place from 14 to 20 December 2020 at the Marshall Arena in Milton Keynes, England. Although the tournament was not sponsored by Cazoo, it was the first of three tournaments that form the Cazoo Cup.

Neil Robertson was the defending champion, having won the previous final 10–8 against Graeme Dott. However, Robertson lost 2–4 to Robert Milkins in the first round.

Judd Trump won the tournament for a third time, beating Jack Lisowski 10–7 to claim his 20th ranking title.

Prize fund
The event had a total prize fund of £380,000, with £100,000 to the winner. The participation prize is £5,000, which did not count towards a player's world ranking. The breakdown of prize money for the event:

 Winner: £100,000
 Runner-up: £40,000
 Semi-final: £20,000
 Quarter-final: £12,500
 Last 16: £7,500
 Last 32: £5,000 (Prize money at this stage did not count towards prize money rankings)
 Highest break: £10,000
 Total: £380,000

Seeding list
The top 32 players on the one-year ranking list, running from the September 2020 European Masters until and including the 2020 Scottish Open, qualified for the tournament.

Tournament draw

Final

Century breaks
A total of 38 century breaks were made by 20 players during the tournament.

 143, 134, 112, 100  Mark Selby
 142, 122, 109, 107, 107, 101, 101, 100  Judd Trump
 142  Mark Allen
 139  Kyren Wilson
 137, 111  Zhao Xintong
 137  Ding Junhui
 137  Lu Ning
 136  Michael Holt
 134  Hossein Vafaei
 132  Stuart Bingham
 130, 127, 112, 111, 110, 109  Jack Lisowski
 128, 108  Anthony McGill
 128  Xiao Guodong
 117  Martin Gould
 116  Robert Milkins
 114  John Higgins
 112  Ali Carter
 112  Barry Hawkins
 108, 105  Ronnie O'Sullivan
 100  Robbie Williams

References

2020
Players Series
2020 in snooker
2020 in English sport
2020
December 2020 sports events in the United Kingdom
Sport in Milton Keynes